Michael Peter Felgate (born 1 April 1991) is an English footballer who plays for Cypriot side Anagennisi Deryneia as a defender.

Career
On 2 September 2012, Felgate made his debut for Ayia Napa in the Cypriot First Division, playing the full match in a 5-0 loss to Omonia Nicosia.

Ahead of the 2019/20 season, Felgate joined ASIL Lysi. He joined Digenis Akritas Morphou for the 2020-21 season before returning to Anagennisi Deryneia.

Personal life
Felgate lived in England before moving to Cyprus at a young age. He has expressed a desire to represent the Cyprus national football team.

References

External links
 
 Player Profile Eurosport

1991 births
Living people
English footballers
Association football defenders
Alki Larnaca FC players
Enosis Neon Paralimni FC players
Ayia Napa FC players
Anagennisi Deryneia FC players
ASIL Lysi players
Digenis Akritas Morphou FC players
Cypriot First Division players
Cypriot Second Division players
English expatriates in Cyprus
Expatriate footballers in Cyprus